Vice Admiral Sir Jeremy Joe Blackham,  (born 10 September 1943) is a former Royal Navy officer who served as Deputy Commander-in-Chief Fleet.

Naval career
Blackham joined the Royal Navy in 1961. He became commanding officer successively of the Ton-class minesweeper , the frigate  and then the destroyer . He was appointed Director of the Royal Navy Staff College in 1986, Director of Naval Plans at the Ministry of Defence in 1989 and then Commanding Officer of the aircraft carrier , which was deployed in the Adriatic Sea at the start of the Bosnian War in 1992, before becoming Chief of Staff at Naval Home Command in 1993. He went on to be Director-General of Naval Personnel Strategy at the Ministry of Defence before being made Assistant Chief of the Naval Staff (and, concurrently, President of the Royal Naval College, Greenwich) in 1995. His last appointments were as Deputy Commander-in-Chief Fleet in 1997 and then Deputy Chief of the Defence Staff (Equipment Capability) in 1999 before retiring in 2002.

In retirement Blackham became UK President of EADS, the defence contractor. Since January 2003 he has served as editor of The Naval Review.

References

External links 

|-

|-

1943 births
Admiral presidents of the Royal Naval College, Greenwich
Living people
Royal Navy vice admirals
Knights Commander of the Order of the Bath